The Bible Collection is a series of films produced for the TNT television network, starting with Abraham in April 1994 and ending with Thomas in April 2001. The Bible Collection consists of a 27-part miniseries in 17 volumes.

The series grew out of an earlier series of Old Testament films produced by the Italian company Five Mile River Films in the 1990s.

Films
The films, originally aired as standalone television movies or as short miniseries, have been gathered and released in a numbered collection, with the secondary series title Close to Jesus on installments covering events during the lifetime of Jesus.  The order of the collection may vary slightly from the order in which the films were originally produced.

The Bible Collection Vol.01 Jesus (1999)
The Bible Collection Vol.02 Jacob (1994)
The Bible Collection Vol.03 Moses (1995)
The Bible Collection Vol.04 Samson and Delilah (1996)
The Bible Collection Vol.05 David (1997)
The Bible Collection Vol.06 Joseph (1995)
The Bible Collection Vol.07 Abraham (1993)
The Bible Collection Vol.08 Jeremiah (1998)
The Bible Collection Vol.09 Solomon (1997)
The Bible Collection Vol.10  (2000)
The Bible Collection Vol.11 Esther (1999)
The Bible Collection Vol.12 The Apocalypse (2000)
The Bible Collection Vol.13 Genesis (1994)
The Bible Collection Vol.14  (2000)
The Bible Collection Vol.15 Judas (2001)
The Bible Collection Vol.16 Thomas (2001)
The Bible Collection Vol.17 Joseph of Nazareth (2000)

See also
List of films based on the Bible

References

Print sources 

 
Bible